{{Chembox
| Verifiedfields = changed
| Watchedfields = changed
| verifiedrevid = 447380975
| ImageFile = SYBR Green I.png
| ImageSize = 
| IUPACName = ''N',N-dimethyl-N-[4-[(E)-(3-methyl--2-ylidene)methyl]-1-phenylquinolin-1-ium-2-yl]-N-propylpropane-1,3-diamine
| OtherNames = 
|Section1=
|Section2=
|Section3=
}}SYBR Green I (SG''') is an asymmetrical cyanine dye used as a nucleic acid stain in molecular biology. The SYBR family of dyes is produced by Molecular Probes Inc., now owned by Thermo Fisher Scientific. SYBR Green I binds to DNA. The resulting DNA-dye-complex best absorbs 497 nanometer blue light (λmax = 497 nm) and emits green light (λmax = 520 nm). The stain preferentially binds to double-stranded DNA, but will stain single-stranded (ss) DNA with lower performance. SYBR Green can also stain RNA with a lower performance than ssDNA.

Uses
SYBR Green finds usage in several areas of biochemistry and molecular biology. It is used as a dye for the quantification of double stranded DNA in some methods of quantitative PCR. It is also used to visualise DNA in gel electrophoresis. Higher concentrations of SYBR Green can be used to stain agarose gels in order to visualise the DNA present. In addition to labelling pure nucleic acids, SYBR Green can also be used for labelling of DNA within cells for flow cytometry and fluorescence microscopy. In these cases RNase treatment may be required to reduce background from RNA in the cells.

Safety
SYBR Green I is marketed as a replacement for ethidium bromide, a potential human mutagen, as both safer to work with and free from the complex waste disposal issues of ethidium bromide. However any small molecule capable of binding DNA with high affinity is a possible carcinogen, including SYBR Green.

In a study using the Ames test, which measures the ability of chemicals to cause mutations, when assayed at the same concentration SYBR Green I was on the order of 30 times less mutagenic than ethidium bromide.

Similar cyanine dyes 
 PicoGreen (PG)
 SYBR Safe
 SYBR Gold
 Thiazole orange (TO)
 Oxazole yellow (YO)
 Safe-Green
 Chai Green

See also 
 GelGreen
__notoc__

Notes and references 

Staining dyes
Cyanine dyes
Benzothiazoles
Quinolines
Dimethylamino compounds
Quaternary ammonium compounds